Dichomeris alogista is a moth of the family Gelechiidae. It was described by Edward Meyrick in 1935. It is known to be found in Hunan province in China.

References

alogista
Moths described in 1935